United States gubernatorial elections were held in 1939, in three states. Kentucky, Louisiana and Mississippi hold their gubernatorial elections in odd numbered years, every 4 years, preceding the United States presidential election year.

Results

References

 
Gubernatorial
November 1939 events